Vladimir Sergeyevich Seryogin (7 July 1922 – 27 March 1968) was a Soviet test pilot.

Vladimir Seryogin became a volunteer of the Red Army after grammar school. His flying abilities recognized, he was directed to piloting. His performance on the Eastern Front of the Second World War resulted in his being awarded several medals including the title Hero of the Soviet Union.

After conclusion of the war Seryogin remained in the Soviet Air Force. After completing an engineering course, he went on to work as a test pilot for the Soviet Air Force Test Institute. In addition, Seryogin was the commanding officer of the Cosmonauts' Flight Preparation organization.

On 27 March 1968, while on a routine training flight from Chkalovsky Air Base with his colleague and friend Yuri Gagarin—the first man ever to have flown in space—the MiG-15UTI they were piloting crashed near the town of Kirzhach. Both pilots were killed in the crash; their bodies were subsequently cremated and the ashes were buried in the walls of the Kremlin on Red Square.

References

External links
 Vladimir Seryogin in "Heroes of country" (in Russian)

1922 births
1968 deaths
Soviet World War II pilots
Soviet Air Force officers
Heroes of the Soviet Union
Burials at the Kremlin Wall Necropolis
Victims of aviation accidents or incidents in the Soviet Union
Recipients of the Order of Lenin
Recipients of the Order of the Red Banner
Soviet test pilots
Soviet colonels